The Hungarian Central Statistical Office (HSCO;) is a quango responsible for collecting, processing and publishing statistics about Hungary, its economy, and its inhabitants. The office provides details for parliamentary and administrative offices, local councils and academia, financial institutions, the public at large and the media.

Functions
 To devise and conduct surveys
 To demand collection of statistical data for  the central state statistical system
 To process and analyse information from the collection of statistical data based on compulsory and voluntary data supply
 To supply data and analysis for state organizations
 To satisfy requests from non-governmental organisations, parties, local government, academic researchers and the general public
To prepare and make the census and to process and publish the data from it.

Regulation
Legal reference: KSH - Rules on Statistics

Organization of National Statistics Act No. XXV of 1874
Hungarian Royal Central Statistical Office Act No XXXV of 1897
Official Statistical Service Act No XIX of 1929
State Statistics Act No VI. of 1952
Statistics Act No. V. of 1973
Statistics Act No. XLVI of 1993

The organisation is also covered by European Union regulation.

Organization structure
There are around  1,050 people employed at the central office, with a further 450 at regional offices.

The head of the Office is called the President, and leads a number of organizational units each headed by a Deputy President and having several departments:

Departments reporting directly to the president
Internal Audit Section
Administration and International
Departments reporting to the Deputy President responsible for statistical issues
Price Statistics
Living Standards and Labour Statistics
Foreign Trade Statistics
Agriculture and Environment Statistics
National Accounts
Population Statistics
Statistical Research and Methodology Department
Sector Accounts
Services Statistics
Social Services Statistics
Business Statistics
Departments reporting to the Deputy President responsible for economic affairs
Financial Management
Technical and System Monitoring
Information Technology
Dissemination
Planning
Directorates
Debrecen
Győr
Miskolc
Pécs
Szeged
Veszprém

See also
 Demographics of Hungary

References

National statistical services
Demographics of Hungary